The Type 067 (NATO reporting name: Yunnan) is a class of utility landing craft (LCU) of the People's Republic of China's People's Liberation Army Navy (PLAN). Production ran from 1968 to 1972, possibly restarting by 1982, and ending in 1992.

Operators

Cameroon received two from China in 2002.

By 2015 most were in reserve or in non-naval service.

Sri Lanka received one from China in 1991 and another in 1995.

References

Sources

Amphibious warfare vessel classes
Amphibious warfare vessels of the People's Liberation Army Navy